Frederick Henry Harvey (June 27, 1835 – February 9, 1901) was an entrepreneur who developed the Harvey House lunch rooms, restaurants, souvenir shops, and hotels, which served rail passengers on the Atchison, Topeka and Santa Fe Railway, the Gulf Colorado and Santa Fe Railway, the Kansas Pacific Railway, the St. Louis-San Francisco Railway, and the Terminal Railroad Association of St. Louis.

As an innovative restaurateur and marketer, Fred Harvey is credited with creating the first restaurant chain in the United States. He was also a leader in promoting tourism in the American Southwest in the late 19th century. Fred Harvey and his employees successfully brought new higher standards of both civility and dining to a region widely regarded in the era as "the Wild West." He created a legacy which was continued by his sons and remained in the family until the death of a grandson in 1965.

Despite the decline of passenger train patronage in the United States in the 20th century with the advent of the automobile, portions of the Fred Harvey Company have continued to operate since 1968 as part of a larger hospitality industry conglomerate.

Early life 
Frederick Henry Harvey was born to mixed Scottish and English parents, and immigrated into the United States from Liverpool, England, in 1853 at the age of 17.  He took a job in New York as a pot scrubber and busboy at Smith and McNell's restaurant, a popular New York city restaurant. There he learned the business from the establishment's quirky proprietors, Henry Smith and T. R. McNell. They taught him the importance of quality service, fresh ingredients and the handshake deal. Harvey quickly worked his way up to busboy, waiter and line cook. This early entry into the world of food service would have large impacts later in his life.  He moved from New York City to New Orleans after 18 months, where he survived a bout with yellow fever, and then to St. Louis where he worked in a jewelry store.  In 1856 he married Barbara Sarah Mattas, with whom he would have six children.

Railroad employment 
Despite successful employment, Harvey felt compelled to return to the food industry. He started a Café with a partner, and the two ran a profitable business.  However, the Civil War soon interfered.  The partner was sympathetic to the Confederacy and left town, taking all of the money the two had earned.  Harvey soon got back on his feet, working for the Hannibal and St. Joseph Railroad which was eventually purchased by the Chicago, Burlington and Quincy Railroad.  He ascended the corporate ladder and was transferred to Leavenworth, Kansas, which would remain his home.  Harvey traveled frequently while working for the railroads and found himself deeply dissatisfied with the food served to travelers.

Entrepreneurship 

Harvey discovered his calling when in 1873, he began a business venture with Jasper "Jeff" S. Rice to set up two eating houses two hundred and eighty miles apart along the Kansas Pacific Railroad, but once again the partnership was doomed.  

Harvey's partnership with the Santa Fe began in 1876 when he struck a deal with an acquaintance, Charles Morse, the superintendent of the Atchison, Topeka and Santa Fe Railroad.  Harvey opened eating houses along the railroad, and was not charged rent by Morse.  The deal was sealed only with a handshake, but it would have huge ramifications for both parties. At their peak, there were 84 Harvey Houses, all of which catered to wealthy and middle-class visitors alike and Harvey became known as "the Civilizer of the West."

Harvey also gained a boost in business with his incorporation of the "Harvey Girl".  He hired women between the ages of 18 and 30 and did not permit them to marry until they had put in a full year of work.  Harvey Girls resided in housing adjacent to the restaurants, where they were supervised by the most senior Girl, who enforced curfews and chaperoned male visits.  Roughly 5000 Harvey Girls moved out West to work and ultimately marry.  Harvey Houses continued to be built and operated into the 1960s. Harvey was the head of the Fred Harvey Company, which operated the hotel and restaurant chain under the leadership of his sons and grandsons until 1965. It was sold in 1968 to the Hawaii-based hospitality industry conglomerate Amfac, Inc.  When Fred Harvey died (of intestinal cancer), there were 47 Harvey House restaurants, 15 hotels, and 30 dining cars operating on the Santa Fe Railway. While some have reported his last words to his sons as "Don't cut the ham too thin, boys," there is another account which addresses the realities of doing business:

"His sandwiches of ham or cheese with an extra slice of bread (three slices in all) for fifteen cents were known everywhere for their value. Of course he had to make his profit or he could not stay in business and therefore this story was told rather reverently by his employees and other denizens of the Southwest spaces. On his deathbed, instead of mentioning debts or bequests to his relatives, he was supposed to have murmured, "Cut the ham thinner, boys."

Innovations in marketing 
Harvey is also known for pioneering the art of commercial cultural tourism. His "Indian Detours" were meant to provide an authentic Native American experience by having actors stage a certain lifestyle in the desert in order to sell tickets to unwitting tourists. Fred Harvey's feats of marketing did not stop at the attraction either, as for tour guides he used attractive women in outfits becoming their figures. This tactic was adapted from his restaurants, where Harvey Girls worked as waitresses.

Fred Harvey was also a postcard publisher, touted as "the best way to promote your Hotel or Restaurant." Most postcards were published in co-operation with the Detroit Publishing Company. Their Arizona "Phostint" postcards are collected worldwide.

Heritage 
Fred Harvey, through the Fred Harvey Company, is credited with creating the first "chain" restaurants in the United States. He is viewed as the "founding father of the American service industry." A Fred Harvey Museum is located in the former Harvey residence in Leavenworth, Kansas. 

A movie musical entitled The Harvey Girls, starring Judy Garland, Cyd Charisse and Angela Lansbury, and based on a near-pulp novel by Samuel Hopkins Adams, was made in 1946.  It won the Academy Award for Best Song for "On the Atchison, Topeka and the Santa Fe." In the 1995 steampunk alternate history novel The Two Georges by Richard Dreyfuss and Harry Turtledove, Harvey is mentioned in the first chapter as having been in the business of airships in addition to railroads.

Further reading
 Stephen Fried. Appetite for America: How Visionary Businessman Fred Harvey Built a Railroad Hospitality Empire That Civilized the Wild West  (Bantam; 2010) 518 pages;

References

External links 
 A Harvey House home page
 The Harvey House museum, Florence, Kansas
 Friends of the Fred Harvey Company (wiki)
 
 "From Desert to Disney World"

1835 births
1901 deaths
People from Leavenworth, Kansas
Atchison, Topeka and Santa Fe Railway people
American people in rail transportation
American railway entrepreneurs
19th-century American businesspeople
Postcard publishers
Fred Harvey Company
British emigrants to the United States